Halopanivirales is an order of viruses.

Taxonomy
The order contains the following families:

 Matshushitaviridae
 Simuloviridae
 Sphaerolipoviridae

References

Virus orders